Paracymoriza multispinea is a moth in the family Crambidae. It was described by Ping You, Shu-Xia Wang and Hou-Hun Li in 2003. It is found in the Chinese provinces of Fujian, Hunan and Guizhou.

The length of the forewings is 7–8 mm for males and 8-8.5 mm for females. The ground colour of the forewings is fulvous to fuscous with a white antemedial, postmedial and submarginal area. The marginal line is dark in females and indistinct in males.

Etymology
The species name is derived from Latin multi- (meaning many) and spineus (meaning spines) and refers to the juxta with many spines on each branch.

References

Acentropinae
Moths described in 2003